Demirtaş (literally "iron rock") is a Turkish name and may refer to:

People
 Aksel Gürcan Demirtaş (born 1973), Turkish female sprinter
 Christian Demirtas (born 1984), German footballer 
 Mehmet Ali Demirtaş (born 1951), Turkish wrestler
 Nurettin Demirtaş (born 1972), Turkish politician
 Onur Demirtaş (born 1982), Turkish footballer 
 Selahattin Demirtaş (born 1973), Turkish politician
 Soner Demirtaş (born 1991), Turkish freestyle sport wrestler

Places
 Demirtaş, Alanya, a village in the district of Alanya, Antalya Province, Turkey
 Demirtaş, Dikili, a village in Dikili district of İzmir Province, Turkey
 Demirtaş, Gerger, a village in the district of Gerger, Adıyaman Province, Turkey
 Demirtaş, Kalecik, a village in the district of Kalecik, Ankara Province, Turkey
 Demirtaş, Karakoçan
 Demirtaş, Oltu
 Demirtaş, Yumurtalık, a village in the district of Yumurtalık, Adana Province, Turkey
 Demirtaş Dam, Turkey

See also
 Timurtash

Turkish-language surnames